Charlotte Painter (born 1926) is an American novelist and writer, best known for her nonfiction photo essay Gifts of Age, which profiles notable older women, including Julia Child.

Painter was born in Baton Rouge, Louisiana. She published her first short story in the New Yorker in 1955. Her first novel, The Fortunes of Laurie Breaux (1961) won her a Wallace Stegner Fellowship in 1962. She earned her Masters in English from Stanford in 1966, and taught there until 1969. She has taught creative writing at the University of California at Berkeley, UC Davis, and UC Santa Cruz as well as at San Francisco State University.

Partial bibliography
The Fortunes of Laurie Breaux (1961)
Who Made the Lamb? (1965)
Confessions from the Malaga Madhouse (1971)
Revelations: Diaries of Women (Vintage Books, 1975) 
Seeing Things (1976)
Gifts of Age: 32 Remarkable Women (Chronicle Books, 1985) 
Conjuring Tibet (Mercury House, 1997)

References

Writers from California
American feminist writers
1926 births
Possibly living people
University of California, Berkeley faculty
University of California, Santa Cruz faculty
San Francisco State University faculty